The Herbert Wertheim College of Medicine is the medical school of Florida International University, located in Modesto A. Maidique Campus in unincorporated Miami-Dade County, Florida. The College of Medicine is one of the university's 26 schools and colleges.

The College of Medicine was founded by the Florida Board of Governors on March 23, 2006. Its inaugural class of 43 students entered in fall 2009 and was the first graduating class in 2013.

For Fall 2010, 3,606 students applied for 43 spots.

The College of Medicine was fully accredited by the Liaison Committee on Medical Education in February 2013.

History

The College of Medicine was founded by the Florida Board of Governors on March 23, 2006. Its inaugural class of 43 students entered in fall 2009, and was the first graduating class in 2013.

On June 12, 2009, longtime FIU benefactor Herbert Wertheim, announced that he would donate $20 million to the FIU College of Medicine, to be matched by state funds for a total of $40 million. Following this, the college was renamed in his honor. Funds from the donation will go to the establishment of the Dr. Herbert and Nicole Wertheim Endowments for Medical Education and Research, as well as the Dr. Herbert and Nicole Wertheim Medical Scholarship Endowment. Half of the endowment, which will be funded over the course of three years to 2012, will be set aside to support scholarships for College of Medicine students and other students pursuing advanced degrees in other scientific fields such as engineering.

Administration
    
Dr. John A. Rock was the founding dean in 2006.  The College's first associate executive dean of academic affairs is Dr. Joe Leigh Simpson, a member of the National Academy of Sciences. Dr. J. Patrick O'Leary is the executive associate dean of clinical affairs and Dr. Sanford Markham was named executive associate dean of student affairs of the college. Dr. Barry P. Rosen is Associate Dean for Basic Research and Graduate Programs.

Admissions

In its inaugural 2009 class, the FIU College of Medicine received 3,247 applicants; 126 were admitted, and 43 enrolled. The average undergraduate GPA was a 3.7. Students of the Class of 2014 came from Alaska, California, Florida, Maryland, and Michigan. 84% of students were from Florida, and 54% were Miamians.

Affiliations
    
FIU Herbert Wertheim College of Medicine works in affiliation with community hospitals: Baptist Health South Florida, Broward Health, Citrus Health Network, Cleveland Clinic Foundation Florida, Jackson Health System, Memorial Health Care System (Hollywood), Mercy Hospital (Miami), Mount Sinai Medical Center & Miami Heart Institute, Miami Children’s Hospital, Miami VA Healthcare System, North Shore Medical Center, Westchester General Hospital, Palmetto General Hospital, Kendall Regional Medical Center, South Florida Evaluation and Treatment Center. These help educate medical students and provide graduates with residency opportunities.

References

External links

Medicine
Florida International University College of Medicine
Educational institutions established in 2006
2006 establishments in Florida